Teuila Blakely (born 12 January 1975) is a Samoan-born New Zealand actress, best known for her roles in Shortland Street, Sione's Wedding, Sione's 2: Unfinished Business, Filthy Rich, and Power Rangers Beast Morphers.

Early life
Blakely was born in Samoa and raised in Tauranga, New Zealand. She is the fourth of five children. Her mother was a Mormon and her father was Catholic.

Career
Blakely started her acting career with minor roles in the Polynesian film The Legend of Johnny Lingo, an appearance on the television series Outrageous Fortune as Savannah, and a voice acting role in Bro'Town as Sina Tapili. Her first major film role came when she was cast as Leilani in the 2006 comedy Sione's Wedding. She returned as Leilani in the 2012 sequel Sione's 2: Unfinished Business.

Blakely is most known for her television role as Vasa Levi on the popular prime-time soap opera Shortland Street from 2010 to 2014. In 2015, Blakely was a contestant on Dancing with the Stars but she and partner Scott Cole were eliminated on 29 June. In 2016, Blakely was cast play the role of Malia on the television series Filthy Rich and also sang "This Is For My Girls" with Laura Daniel, Daisy Lawless, Lucy Lawless, Saraid Cameron, Kimberley Crossman, Kura Forrester and Ilah Cooper.

In 2021, she made an appearance as TV3's guest panellist reacting to the interview between Oprah Winfrey, Prince Harry and Meghan Markle.

Personal life
Blakely gave birth to her son Jared at the age of 17.

Filmography

Film

Television

References

External links
 

1975 births
Living people
Actresses of Samoan descent
New Zealand film actresses
New Zealand soap opera actresses
New Zealand television actresses
Samoan emigrants to New Zealand